This is a list of prisoners who have received a whole life order, formerly called a whole life tariff, through some mechanism in jurisdictions of the United Kingdom. From the introduction of the whole life order system in 1983 until an appeal by a prisoner named Anthony Anderson in 2002, a whole life order was set by government ministers. Thereafter only a judicial body could decide to impose such an order. The effect of a whole life order is that the prisoner serves the sentence of life imprisonment without the possibility of parole.

Whole life orders have been reportedly issued in approximately 100 cases since introduction in 1983, although some of these prisoners have since died in custody, or had their sentences reduced on appeal. By 2017, there were believed to be at least 75 prisoners currently serving whole life sentences in England and Wales. These include some of Britain's most notorious criminals, including the serial murderer Rosemary West.

A number of these prisoners, including the "Yorkshire Ripper" Peter Sutcliffe and Moors murderers Ian Brady and Myra Hindley have died in prison since being sentenced. There are also some prisoners, including police killer David Bieber, whose sentences have been reduced on appeal.

Some of Britain's most notorious murderers are not among those serving whole life sentences. These include convicted child killers Roy Whiting and Ian Huntley. Both murderers have been issued 40-year minimum terms by the High Court, which means that they are likely to remain imprisoned for most if not all of their remaining lives, while many other prisoners are in a similar position due to the length of their minimum terms and the age they will be when they can be considered for parole. Nor was triple police killer Harry Roberts included in the list, despite media reports that he was among the prisoners subjected to this sentence. Roberts served 48 years prior to his release in 2014, after his trial judge in 1966 recommended a minimum sentence of 30 years. In the case of Roberts, the Parole Board, not the Home Secretary or a judge, were the entity responsible for his continued incarceration beyond the minimum.

Other criminals such as David Copeland have had their an initial minimum sentences increased. His trial judge recommended a minimum of 30 years, but this was eventually increased to a minimum of 50 years by the High Court. Copeland can only be released after 50 years if considered not to be dangerous at that point. This is set to keep him imprisoned until at least 2049 and the age of 73.

Several prisoners serving whole life sentences have challenged the legality of whole life sentences in the High Court or European Court of Human Rights. These include Jeremy Bamber and Gary Vinter, whose second legal challenge to the European Court of Human Rights was successful, although the High Court later ruled that whole life sentences could still be issued as long as they were reviewed within 25 years. Arthur Hutchinson has challenged his sentence at least four times in both the High Court and the European Court of Human Rights, but has been unsuccessful each time.

Despite the fact that ministers can no longer set sentences they still retain the power to release a prisoner during their sentences on compassionate grounds, normally exercised only when a prisoner is terminally ill. Several months before ministers were stripped of their powers to set minimum sentences, the High Court also stripped ministers of their power to overrule the Parole Board's decision that a life sentence prisoner can be paroled.

Imposed by Home Secretaries
Successive Home Secretaries are known to have imposed whole life orders for at least 23 murderers between 1983 and 2002 (note, this list is incomplete). In 2002, a former Junior Home Office Minister during the 1980s, Douglas Hogg, admitted to setting 600 tariffs between 1986 and 1989 on behalf of the Home Secretary.

Sentenced by judges
Since the European Court of Human Rights decision, only trial judges and the High Court have had the power to impose a whole life order. In that time, there have been at least 63 instances of trial judges recommending that an offender should never be released.

Several of these prisoners have had their whole life tariffs reduced on appeal by the High Court.

Quashed whole life orders 
 Patrick Magee, who bombed the Grand Hotel in Brighton in October 1984, killing five people and nearly killing his intended target Prime Minister Margaret Thatcher and her Cabinet. He was convicted in 1985 of five counts of murder and several explosive and terrorism offences as well, with a recommendation that he serve 35 years in prison, which was increased later to whole life by Michael Howard. He was however released after 14 years, served in mainland British prisons in 1999 as part of the Good Friday Agreement.
 Joe O'Connell, Eddie Butler, Hugh Doherty and Harry Duggan were members of IRA active service unit the Balcombe Street Gang, that terrorised London in the mid 1970s, killing six people, injuring many others and planning more attacks which were later foiled or never carried out. They were caught after they took a couple hostage in their flat in Marylebone while attempting to escape police pursuit and surrendered after six days. They were later each given whole life tariffs by the Home Secretary, however they were released as part of the Good Friday Agreement. During their trial they admitted to the Woolwich pub bombing and Guildford pub bombing, which others were convicted of and served time for.
 Harry Mackenney was convicted of four counts of murder in 1980 alongside his co-defendant Terry Pinfold who was convicted of procuring Harry Mackenney to murder business associate Terrence Eve after murderer John Childs turned evidence against the two. He was cleared in 2003 along with Terry Pinfold after spending over 20 years in prison when the court of appeal accepted that John Childs was a compulsive liar. He was originally sentenced to life with a recommended minimum term of 25 years by Mr Justice May, but was told in 1996 by the home secretary that he would never be released.
 Ronald William Barton was convicted of murdering his 14-year-old stepdaughter Keighley Barton in October 1986, in what was believed as an attempt on Barton's part to stop Keighley from testifying against him for child abuse and to gain revenge against her mother. He had several previous convictions for gross indecency against Keighley and sexual assault against other teenage girls, one of which he had been in prison for. After his conviction, his trial judge recommended a minimum sentence of 25 years; but the Lord Chief Justice then ruled that life must mean life, which the Home Secretary agreed with. The term was reset in 1997 to the original 25 years, which was reduced again to 23 years in 2006.
 IRA terrorists Thomas Quigley and Paul Kavanagh were both convicted of two murders in a bomb attack in 1981 by the Chelsea Barracks which also injured 39 people. They were both sentenced to 35 years in prison each in 1985 and were told in 1996 by the Home Secretary Michael Howard that they were to receive whole life tariffs, however the order was reversed by the Belfast High Court in 1997 after an appeal by the two men and they were released under the Good Friday Agreement.
 David Wynne Roberts was convicted of murdering a pensioner who was a friend of his grandmother in Anglesey, Wales when he was 14 in 1969 and served seven years in youth detention before being released in 1976 and moving to the North West of England. In 1985, he went to Blackpool where he met a staff from a hotel in Ambleside, Cumbria and stayed with them until he disappeared in early-1986 when the body of the hotel owner was discovered in a cottage, where she was stabbed and strangled with her own scarf. He gave himself in to police in London within a month after the crime and was convicted of murder with a recommended minimum of 18 years, with the Home Secretary setting a whole life tariff in 1988, before being reduced to 22 years in 2005 on appeal.
 John Cannan, who was convicted of the murder of Shirley Banks in Bristol on 8 October 1987, attempted kidnapping of Julia Holman and a rape in Reading. He was sentenced with a recommendation that should never be released from prison by Mr Justice Drake at Exeter Crown Court in April 1989, however this was overturned when the Lord Chief Justice and the Home Secretary at the time decided that he should serve at least 35 years instead.
 Howard Hughes, who was convicted in July 1996 of the Murder of Sophie Hook in Llandudno 12 months earlier. He denied the murder of Sophie, of Great Budworth, Cheshire, who was seven years old when she died, but was found guilty of rape and murder at Chester Crown Court – largely on the basis of his father’s claim that he admitted the murder shortly after his arrest – and jailed for life with a recommendation that he should never be released. Two subsequent appeals against his conviction were rejected, despite a number of sources casting doubt over his guilt and no forensic evidence directly linking him to the crime. In November 2002, Hughes was one of four convicted child murderers who received 50-year minimum terms imposed by the-then Home Secretary David Blunkett shortly before politicians were stripped of their powers to decide minimum terms for life sentence prisoners. The 50-year minimum term meant that Hughes would not be able to apply for parole until 2045 and the age of 80.
 Timothy Morss and Brett Tyler, who murdered nine-year-old Daniel Handley from East London in October 1994 and buried his body near Bristol, where it was found five months later. They were sentenced to life imprisonment in May 1996 and the trial judge recommended that they should never be released, as he felt they would never cease to pose a danger to children. In November 2002, the pair were among four convicted child murderers who were issued with 50-year minimum terms by the then Home Secretary David Blunkett, just before politicians were stripped of their powers to set minimum terms for life sentence prisoners; this meant that Morss and Tyler would both be over 80 years old before parole could be considered.
 Roy Whiting, who murdered Sarah Payne in West Sussex in July 2000, was told by his trial judge when convicted in December 2001 that his crime (combined with the fact that he had a previous conviction for child abduction and indecent assault) was a rare case for which a life sentence should mean life. In November 2002, Home Secretary David Blunkett ruled that Whiting should serve at least 50 years in prison, meaning he would only qualify for parole if he lived to the age of 92 or beyond, although this in practice revoked the whole life tariff recommended in court. Whiting appealed against this ruling, his lawyers arguing that Blunkett's ruling had been politically motivated as he was on the verge of losing his powers to set minimum terms for life sentence prisoners, and that the government was under mounting pressure from the British public due to the recent start of a firefighters strike. The crime had also attracted widespread media and public attention, and led to calls for tighter laws regarding the monitoring of convicted sex offenders. The ruling also came days after the death of Myra Hindley, whose continued imprisonment saw her described by some sources as a "political prisoner" whose sentence was repeatedly increased to serve the interests of the serving government. Whiting's appeal was heard in June 2010, when the High Court (which by this stage now had the final say on how long a life sentence prisoner should serve before being considered for parole) reduced Whiting's minimum sentence to 40 years, meaning that he will first qualify for parole from 2041 and the age of 82.
 David Morris was convicted in 2002 murdering three generations of the same family in 1999. His victims were 80-year-old Doris Dawson, her 34-year-old daughter Mandy Power and her two granddaughters, 10-year-old Katie and 8-year-old Emily, by beating them with a pole and then setting the house on fire where their bodies were discovered by firefighters and the trial judge said that the "exceptional savagery" of the murders meant that Morris should never be released. However, in July 2007, the sentenced was reduced to a recommendation of 32 years in prison.
 David Bieber, an American former marine who fatally shot an already wounded policeman in the head and wounded two others in Leeds on Boxing Day 2003, also injuring two other officers (which saw him convicted on two counts of attempted murder),was jailed for life in December 2004 with a recommendation he should never be released. The whole life tariff was quashed in July 2008 and replaced by one of 37 years. This means he will be at least 75 before parole can be considered.
 Stephen Ayre, who was paroled in 2005 after serving 20 years of a life sentence for the murder of a 25-year-old woman, committed rape of a 10-year-old boy at knifepoint in Bradford within months of his release. He was sentenced to life imprisonment again at his trial in April 2006, and told that he should never be released, a recommendation normally only made in the case of people convicted of murder. However, his whole life tariff was later quashed on appeal and replaced with a minimum of 10 years.
 Trevor Hamilton, jailed for life in August 2006 for the murder of 65-year-old librarian Attracta Haron in Northern Ireland in December 2003. Hamilton, who was 21 when he committed the murder and 24 when jailed, had his whole life tariff reduced to 35 years on appeal in June 2008, meaning that he will be in his late fifties before parole can be considered.
 Clement McNally who was serving a life term for stabbing a friend outside a house in 2002, strangled his cellmate Anthony Hesketh in Manchester's Strangeways Prison in September 2003 and pleaded guilty to manslaughter and was given a whole life tariff as a result. In October 2009, it was reduced on appeal to 20 years in prison on account of his mentally abnormal condition.
 Reginald Wilson was convicted in 1991 of murdering skin specialist David Birkett with a hammer in 1990 and was sentenced to life in prison. Three years later he was informed by the Home Secretary that life should mean life. This was reduced to a 30-year tariff in 2008. He has proved to be a disruptive and dangerous prisoner; he tried to stab a prison officer in 1999 and was transferred to the prisons close supervision centre unit where he is held in the exceptional risk unit.
 John Hilton was convicted of murder with two other men, Philip Kelly and Charles Connelly during the Mitcham Co-op Robbery and was sentenced to life in prison, while his accomplice George Thatcher was sentenced to death by hanging for capital murder in 1963, only to have his death sentence quashed soon afterwards and replaced with a life sentence from which he was paroled after 18 years. John Hilton served 15 years and was released on licence in 1978, where a month after he shot and killed a diamond jeweller and accidentally shot his partner who then bled to death, he was then given a whole life tariff. The sentence was later reduced to 25 years in prison in 2009 on account of exceptional progress in prison.
 Peter Bryan is a murderer who killed Nisha Sheth, the daughter of an employer who sacked him for stealing, with a hammer in 1993. He was released in 2004 and by agreement of the doctors at the Newham General Hospital allowed to leave the ward on which he was staying whenever he liked. On this ward, he murdered Bryan Cherry by dismembering him and then eating a part of his brain. When he was admitted to Broadmoor, he killed Richard Loudwell, who was awaiting trial for murder by bashing his head against the floor and strangling him and as a result was given a whole life tariff. It was reduced on appeal to 15 years in 2006 on the basis that the trial judge didn't give enough consideration to his mental health.
 Danilo Restivo was convicted in 2011 for the 2002 murder of Heather Barnet. In a second trial, Restivo was later sentenced to 30 years in prison for the murder of a teenager in his native Italy in 1993. In 2012 his term was reduced to 40 years as part of a joint appeal by several prisoners with long sentences.
 Michael Roberts was convicted in 2012 of numerous offences between 1988–2005, including rapes. His sentence was reduced to life with a 25-year minimum at the same appeal that reduced Restivo's sentence. Until the sentencing of prolific child sex offender John Wass in August 2017, Roberts was the only person in British legal history to have been handed a whole life tariff for a crime other than murder.
 Anthony Entwistle, then aged 38, murdered 16-year old Michelle Calvy in April 1987, abducting her from a towpath in Blackburn, raping her, and strangling her with her T-shirt. He dumped her body in Tockholes. The murder was 18 days after his release from a 10-year sentence in 1980 for rape, which followed another seven-year sentence in 1974 for sexually assaulting two women. He was found guilty of Calvy's murder at Preston Crown Court in March 1988, and sentenced to life imprisonment with trial judge Mr. Justice Rose recommending a minimum term of 25 years. He was later given a whole-life tariff by the Home Secretary Douglas Hurd. In 2009, Mr. Justice Davis ruled at the High Court that Entwistle could be considered for release after 25 years (less 10 months spent on remand) if he was judged to no longer be a threat to the public, rather than imposing a whole life tariff, saying that "He can only be released if ever (and it may be never) he is assessed as no longer a danger to the public." The parole board turned down his request for release in June 2013.
 David Martin Simmons had originally received a whole-life term for rape and false imprisonment. This was reduced to a ten-year minimum when he appealed alongside Restivo, Roberts, and others whose appeals were not successful.
 Donald Andrews had received a whole-life term for rape and kidnapping in 2012, while having two previous convictions for manslaughter. This was reduced to a twelve-year minimum when he appealed in 2015, making him eligible for release in 2024.
 Simon Smith was convicted of murdering three of his children (all under a year old) between 1989 and 1994, which were initially believed to be cot deaths. His trial judge at Stafford Crown Court in 1996 recommended that he should never be released. Smith was however told at a later date he could apply for parole from 2020 after serving a minimum of 24 years.
 Ian Stewart was convicted of murdering his fiancee Helen Bailey and later his wife Diane Stewart and sentenced to life without parole. However, Stewart appealed to the Court of Appeal and had his sentence for Bailey's murder reduced to a minimum of 35 years. Wayne Couzens, who murdered Sarah Everard, appealed alongside Stewart but his whole-life order was upheld.

See also 
 Life imprisonment in England and Wales
 List of longest prison sentences
 List of longest prison sentences served

References

Life imprisonment
Whole life